Torsten Müller or Mueller may refer to:

 (born 1957), German musician
Torsten Müller (agroscientist) (born 1962), German agroscientist